What Ever Happened to Aunt Alice? is a 1969 American neo-noir thriller film directed by Lee H. Katzin with Bernard Girard (uncredited), and starring Geraldine Page, Ruth Gordon, Rosemary Forsyth, Robert Fuller and Mildred Dunnock. The screenplay by Theodore Apstein, based on the novel The Forbidden Garden by Ursula Curtiss, focuses on an aging Arizona widow who hires elderly female housekeepers and cons them out of their money before murdering them.

The film's title is a reference to the 1962 horror film What Ever Happened to Baby Jane?, which was also produced by Robert Aldrich. Both films are considered part of the psycho-biddy subgenre, in which a formerly glamorous and now older woman has become psychotic.

The music score was by Gerald Fried and the cinematography by Joseph F. Biroc. The film was funded by American Broadcasting Company (ABC), Palomar Pictures Corporation, and The Associates & Aldrich Company, and distributed by Cinerama Releasing Corporation.

Plot

Claire Marrable, the vainglorious aging widow of a prominent businessman, is distraught upon discovering that her husband's estate has been stripped of all assets, leaving her in debt and with nowhere to live. His only personal effects include a briefcase, a butterfly collection, two antique daggers and a stamp collection.

Claire relocates to Tucson, Arizona to be close to her nephew, George, and his wife Julia. Late one evening, Claire lures her live-in housekeeper, Rose Hull, outside to plant a pine tree, and clobbers her to death with a rock before burying her in a shallow grave. She hires the timid Edna Tinsley as a replacement housekeeper shortly after. Edna invests money in stocks Claire claims to have gained significant capital on; when she inquires about them, Claire murders her in the same fashion as the last housekeeper, burying her in the yard beneath a new pine tree. She burns all of Edna's belongings except for her Bible, though she disposes of the front page which bears Edna's name.

At one of George and Julia's dinner parties, Claire is introduced to Harriet Vaughn, a young widow from the East Coast whose husband was a stock broker. Harriet and her young nephew, Jim, rent a cottage from George, much to Claire's displeasure as the cottage neighbors her property. Harriet subsequently begins a romance with Mike Darrah, a car restorationist from Phoenix. Meanwhile, Claire hires retired nurse Alice Dimmock as her new housekeeper. Alice discovers Edna's Bible in Claire's library and is visibly perturbed, and later retrieves pieces of Edna's mail; the letters enquire about Edna's whereabouts. Claire claims Edna was a drunk and she fired her, but Alice appears skeptical of her story.

One afternoon, a stray Labrador Retriever named Chloe continues to bark viciously outside Clarie's house. Claire grows worried that the dog will unearth the bodies and makes several attempts to get rid of her. She reveals to Alice that Chloe is a tramp and that her former housekeeper, Rose Hull, used to feed and care for Chloe.

Mike stops by one day to visit Alice; he is, in fact, Alice's nephew. It is revealed that Alice is posing as a housekeeper to investigate her good friend Edna's disappearance. Mike uncovers Edna's bank account, which has been almost entirely drained of funds. Claire plans an impromptu trip to attend a music festival in New Mexico the next morning. Alice asks if she can drive into town, claiming that she needs to buy toothpaste and stockings for the trip; while she is gone, Claire finds a full tube of toothpaste in Alice's bathroom. Suspicious, she investigates further, and finds a new box of stockings in Alice's dresser. Claire finds a letter to Alice from Mike regarding Edna's bank account, confirming her suspicion that Alice is on to her.

Claire confronts Alice, who admits that she is searching for Edna, and demands to know where she is before accusing her of murder. The women begin fighting, and Claire chases Alice through the house. Claire beats Alice over the head with a phone receiver, rendering her unconscious. The next morning, Harriet stops by to tell Claire that George has been attempting to call, but has been unable to reach her. Inside, Claire tells her that Alice injured her head on a falling tree branch during a windstorm the night before and pretends, within  Harriet's earshot, to talk to an incapacitated Alice in her bedroom.

That afternoon, Claire dresses herself in Alice's clothes and wig, and drives the incapacitated Alice to a nearby lake and sinks the car. Shortly after, George and Julia arrive at the same time as a telephone repairman. George asks where Alice is, and Claire claims that she went to the drugstore to retrieve allergy medication. Mike and Harriet arrive moments later, inquiring about Alice's whereabouts. George answers a phone call notifying that Alice was found dead in her car, which crashed off the road into the lake. That night, Claire invites Harriet and Jim over for dinner and serves them drugged egg nog. Jim is fascinated by Claire's husband's stamp collection, and Claire offers to give it to him. Once Harriet and Jim are unconscious, she drags their bodies into their cottage and lights the home on fire, trapping Chloe in the process.

In the morning, Claire finds the pine trees in her yard upturned and the graves exposed. She is confronted by the sheriff, George and Julia, as well as Harriet, Jim, and Mike; Mike saved them the night before and stopped the fire. Jim returns the stamp collection to Claire, which she learns is, in fact, worth over $100,000. Claire looks over her pine trees and laughs hysterically; stating that, perhaps it's time that she, herself, should offer her services as a live-in companion.

Cast

Production
The Forbidden Garden by Ursula Curtiss was published in 1962. The New York Times called it "chilling". The Guardian said it was one of the author's best and should be "read in one sitting".

Film rights were bought by Robert Aldrich who had produced two successful horror films, What Ever Happened to Baby Jane? (1962) and Hush...Hush, Sweet Charlotte (1964). Both films dealt with aged women who become scheming or demented, resorting to violence and murder.

In September 1967, Aldrich announced he would make the film under the title What Ever Happened to Aunt Alice? It would be made by his production company, The Associates & Aldrich. In October Aldrich announced the film would be part of a four-picture deal his company signed with ABC Pictures, the others being The Killing of Sister George (1968), (then uncompleted) The Greatest Mother of 'em All (1970), and Too Late the Hero (also 1970). William Inge was signed to write the script.

Aldrich did not direct What Ever Happened to Aunt Alice?, but he did produce it. Bernard Girard was the original director.

By August, Geraldine Page and Ruth Gordon had signed to play the leads and the script was written by Theodore Apstein. "It's a wonderful part and a wonderful script", said Gordon.

Geraldine Page's character, Claire Marrable, portrayed an aging woman, when in fact, Page was 43–44 years old at the time during the film's production and release.

Filming for What Ever Happened to Aunt Alice? began on October 23, 1968 on location in Tucson, Arizona, with additional photography taking place at Aldrich Studios in Los Angeles. Principal photographing was completed on January 5, 1969.

Robert Fuller, who had a supporting role, had been signed to a three-picture contract with the Associates & Aldrich.

In November, it was announced that Bernard Girard, who was directing the film, "has withdrawn due to differences in interpretation" and would be replaced by Lee Katzin.

Release

Theatrical
What Ever Happened to Aunt Alice? premiered theatrically in New York City on July 23, 1969 in 48 theatres and grossed $540,000 in its first week, placing number one at the box office in the United States. It was subsequently given a wide release on August 20, 1969. The film opened the 1969 Cork Film Festival in Ireland, and received its European premiere in London on September 21, 1969.

Critical reception
The Los Angeles Times called the film a "thoroughly enjoyably romp of jolly horror".
Vincent Canby of The New York Times deemed the film "an amusingly baroque horror story told by a master misogynist", and praised Page as an "affecting" actress. Variety similarly praised the acting, noting: "Page as a high and mighty wealthy eccentric delivers a bravura performance. Gordon, working crisply, offers a remarkable portrait of a brave woman. The two ladies play off each other relentlessly and audience reaps the rewards."

Donald Guarisco of AllMovie wrote: "This Robert Aldrich production is a second-tier version of the thrills he pioneered in his self-directed film What Ever Happened to Baby Jane? The problem is simple: What Ever Happened to Aunt Alice? has the stars right, but the material is underdeveloped. The script has an engaging premise that would be a perfect vehicle for all sorts of creepy thrills, but the story never capitalizes on the possibilities of its memorable lead character duo."

Box office
The film earned rentals of $2,025,000 in North America and $1.2 million in other countries. After all costs were deducted, it recorded a loss of $860,000.

Home video
The film was released for the first time on DVD on July 11, 2000 by Anchor Bay Entertainment and again in 2004 by MGM, though both releases have been discontinued. The 2004 edition was additionally released as part of the now-discontinued MGM Movie Collection: 4 Horror Movies (alongside Edge of Sanity, The Spiral Staircase and Equus) on February 1, 2011.

On January 17, 2018, Kino Lorber announced they would be releasing the film on Blu-ray and DVD featuring a 4K restoration. It was finally confirmed on October 31, 2018, that the film would receive its Blu-ray and DVD release on January 8, 2019.

Proposed follow-up
In October 1969, Aldrich announced that he would make a fourth What Ever Happened to... film, What Ever Happened to Dear Elva? based on the novel Goodbye, Aunt Elva by Elizabeth Fenwick. However, the film was never made.

See also

 1969 in film
 List of American films of 1969
 List of films shot in Arizona
 List of horror films of 1969
 List of thriller films of the 1960s
 Psycho-biddy

References

Works cited

External links 
 
 
 

1969 films
1960s crime thriller films
1960s psychological thriller films
ABC Motion Pictures films
American crime thriller films
American psychological thriller films
American serial killer films
Films based on American novels
Films based on thriller novels
Films directed by Lee H. Katzin
Films scored by Gerald Fried
Films set in Tucson, Arizona
Films shot in Tucson, Arizona
Cinerama Releasing Corporation films
Psycho-biddy films
1960s English-language films
1960s American films